The Original Slope County Courthouse is a historic courthouse in Amidon, North Dakota, United States. The courthouse, which became a courthouse in 1915, was the first courthouse in Slope County. The building served as a temporary courthouse; extant temporary courthouses are highly unusual, as most had poor construction and did not last to the present day. The Slope County building had many other uses, though, which were largely responsible for its survival. The building was a church before it became a courthouse; after the courthouse moved out, the building held a school and two other churches before becoming a senior center in 1979.

The courthouse was added to the National Register of Historic Places on November 14, 1985.  

Noting that a building may be so far "remodeled so they no longer closely resemble the style during their period of historical significance", North Dakota's State Historic Preservation Board was to meet in January 2015 to consider delisting the property.

It was in fact removed from the National Register due to numerous modifications on April 3, 2015.

References

External links

  (March 24, 2007)

Courthouses on the National Register of Historic Places in North Dakota
Government buildings completed in 1915
County courthouses in North Dakota
National Register of Historic Places in Slope County, North Dakota
1915 establishments in North Dakota